Nottingham Township is one of nine townships in Wells County, Indiana, United States. As of the 2010 census, its population was 1,062 and it contained 409 housing units.

Geography

Unincorporated towns
 Domestic at 
 Nottingham at 
 Petroleum at 
 Phenix at 
(This list is based on USGS data and may include former settlements.)

Adjacent townships
 Harrison Township (north)
 Hartford Township, Adams County (east)
 Jackson Township, Jay County (southeast)
 Penn Township, Jay County (south)
 Harrison Township, Blackford County (southwest)
 Chester Township (west)
 Liberty Township (northwest)

Cemeteries
The township contains these four cemeteries: Bloxsom, Grannand, Old Salem and Stahl.

School districts
 Southern Wells Community Schools

Political districts
 Indiana's 6th congressional district
 State House District 82
 State Senate District 19

References
 United States Census Bureau 2007 TIGER/Line Shapefiles
 United States Board on Geographic Names (GNIS)
 IndianaMap

External links
 Indiana Township Association
 United Township Association of Indiana

Townships in Wells County, Indiana
Townships in Indiana